The Dodge Kahuna was a concept car created by Dodge — a minivan variant targeted at the surfer — and introduced at the 2003 Detroit Auto Show with the Dodge Avenger Concept.

The Kahuna featured a Pacific Blue exterior and three rows of flexible seats — a variation of the Stow N' Go seating introduced by Chrysler on its minivans in 2005.  It was powered by a turbocharged 2.4 L engine (rated at 215 hp) coupled to a 4-speed automatic transmission. Most components in the Kahuna were based on the company's minivans.

External links
Car Design News  '03 Detroit Auto Show Highlights: Dodge Kahuna

Kahuna